The Czech Lion Awards are annual awards that recognize accomplishments in filmmaking and television. It is the highest award of achievement in film awarded in the Czech Republic. The jury is composed of members of the Czech Film and Television Academy (ČFTA).

Eligible films must have been released in the year prior to the awards ceremony.

Categories

Main Awards 
 Best Film
 Best Director
 Best Screenplay 
 Best Cinematography
 Best Editing
 Best Sound 
 Best Music 
 Best Actor in Leading Role
 Best Actress in Leading Role
 Best Supporting Actor
 Best Supporting Actress 
 Unique Contribution to Czech Film 
 Best TV Series
 Best Documentary
 Best Television Film or Miniseries
 Best Short Film
 Best Animated Film
 Best Costume Design
 Best Makeup and Hairstyling
 Best Stage Design

Special awards 
 Best Film Poster
 Film Fans Award
 Best Student Film

Czech Lion winners

Single films with most awards

Best actors and actresses

References

 
Czech film awards
Awards established in 1994
1994 establishments in the Czech Republic